Ember Records was an American independent record label, run by Al Silver in New York City as the sister label to his Herald imprint. Among the artists on the label were the Five Satins, who recorded the Fred Parris song "In the Still of the Night", and New Orleans saxophonist Lee Allen who hit with "Walking With Mr. Lee". Herald and Ember closed down in the mid-1960s.

References

American independent record labels